Henri Munyaneza (born 19 June 1984) is a retired Rwandan footballer. He was capped for the Rwanda national football team and was a squad member at the 2004 African Cup of Nations.

References

1984 births
Living people
People from Kigali
Rwandan footballers
Rwanda international footballers
2004 African Cup of Nations players
Beerschot A.C. players
S.C. Eendracht Aalst players
Sint-Truidense V.V. players
F.C.V. Dender E.H. players
RWS Bruxelles players
Sportkring Sint-Niklaas players
Rwandan expatriate footballers
Expatriate footballers in Belgium
Rwandan expatriate sportspeople in Belgium
Belgian Pro League players
Challenger Pro League players
Association football forwards